"Alane" is a song recorded by Cameroonian artist Wes. It was released in May 1997 as the debut single from his album, Welenga (1996). It became a hit across Europe, topping the charts in Austria, Belgium, France and the Netherlands. It is sung in the Duala language of Cameroon though the Tony Moran remix includes English lyrics ("Alane flows like a fountain, running gently to your heart. Alane dances inside me, like a flame in to your arms").

Critical reception
Pan-European magazine Music & Media wrote that "African chants meet state-of-the-art dance beats on this sizzling hot dance track, which has already been firmly entrenched atop the French charts for a couple of weeks. The host of Todd Terry remixes made available range from fairly straightforward to plain adventurous, something that ensures the track appeals to a broad range of formats." A reviewer from Sunday Mirror rated it seven out of ten, adding, "This Euro-stomper with lots of wailing and chanting Afro-vocals is sure to be a huge hit in the nightclubs - and on the Terry Wogan show."

Chart performance
In France, the song was sponsored by TF1, Fun Radio, RTL and the Malongo Coffees. The single spent ten weeks at number-one and remained in the top 50 for 25 weeks, ten of them at the top (and a further 9 weeks in the Top 10.)

The song also reached number-one in Belgium (9 weeks at number-one and a further 8 weeks in the top 10), Austria (8 weeks at number-one and a further 9 weeks in the top 10) and The Netherlands (8 weeks at number-one and a further 8 weeks in the top 10) as well as reaching the top 10 in Germany (where it spent 18 weeks in the Top 10), Hungary, Ireland, Israel and Switzerland (10 weeks in the top 10) and number 11 in the UK.

Music video
The music video for "Alane" was directed by Philippe Gautier. The choreography was created by American-French singer Mia Frye.

Track listings

 12" single
 "Alane" (trouser enthusiasts orgasmic apparition mix) – 10:43
 "Alane" (Trouser enthusiasts spectrophiliac dub) – 6:51

 CD single
 "Alane" (radio mix) – 3:40
 "Alane" (club remix – short version) – 3:37

 12" maxi
 "Alane" (trouser enthusiasts orgasmic apparition mix) – 10:43
 "Alane" (trouser enthusiasts spectrophiliac mix) – 6:51
 "Alane" (Todd Terry's club remix) – 8:04
 "Alane" (Tony Moran's club mix) – 4:40
 "Alane" (radio mix) – 3:40

 CD maxi - Todd Terry Remixes
 "Alane" (radio mix) – 3:40
 "Alane" (club mix – full version) – 8:06
 "Alane" (drop mix – full version) – 8:07
 "Alane" (club remix – short version) – 3:38
 "Alane" (a capella) – 3:36

 CD maxi - Tony Moran Remixes
 "Alane" (Tony Moran Main Pass Mix) - 4:39
 "Alane" (Tony Moran Instrumental Mix) - 4:40
 "Alane" (Tony Moran A Capella) - 4:40
 "Alane" (Philcat Fishing Widow Mix) - 6:39

Credits
 Written by Wes
 Composed, arranged and produced by Michel Sanchez
 Artwork by Design, Bronx (Paris)
 Photography (photo remix) by Laurent Edeline
 Photography (photo) by Yan Leuvrey
 Trouser enthusiasts orgasmic apparition mix:  programmed by Torsten Gascoigne, produced by Trouser Enthusiasts
 Trouser enthusiasts spectrophiliac mix: remixed and produced by Trouser Enthusiasts
 Todd Terry's club remix: remixed by Todd Terry
 Tony Moran's club mix: remixed by Tony Moran

Charts

Weekly charts

Year-end charts

Decade-end charts

Certifications and sales

Robin Schulz and Wes version

German DJ and record producer Robin Schulz released a remake of the song on 19 June 2020 which is included on the album IIII (2021). Schulz had been a fan of the original 1997 song since he was 10 years old and got in touch with Wes via Warner Music. The two musicians met in Paris and then re-recorded the track in a studio in Germany. Its music video was directed by Robert Wunsch and features appearances by Schulz and Wes, along with footage of 30 dancers in 12 countries across the world, including Australia, Brazil, France, Germany, Kenya, Mexico, South Korea, Turkey, Tunisia, Vietnam, and the United States.

Track listings

Charts

Weekly charts

Year-end charts

Certifications

References

1997 debut singles
1997 songs
2020 singles
Dutch Top 40 number-one singles
Number-one singles in Austria
Robin Schulz songs
Ultratop 50 Singles (Flanders) number-one singles
Ultratop 50 Singles (Wallonia) number-one singles
SNEP Top Singles number-one singles
Wes Madiko songs
World music songs
Sony Music singles
Epic Records singles
Warner Music Group singles
Songs about dancing